The Vasco Era were an Australian three piece rock/blues band based in Melbourne.

Career
Originally from Apollo Bay, but now based in Melbourne, the band's members are brothers Sid (vocals, guitar, lapsteel, rototoms) and Ted (bass) O'Neil and Michael Fitzgerald (drums). In 2004 the band won the Australian National Campus Band Competition, the largest band competition in the southern hemisphere.

In 2006, The Vasco Era supported Wolfmother at The Astoria in London and played major festivals in Australia including Southbound, the East Coast Blues & Roots Music Festival, The Great Escape, Groovin' The Moo, the Apollo Bay Music Festival and the Falls Festival. Also in 2006, the band flew to San Francisco to record their debut album with producer Jeff Saltzman. The first single from the album, "When We All Lost It" was released to radio on 29 October 2006. Their debut album Oh We Do Like To Be Beside The Seaside was released on 5 May 2007. It was also nominated for the 2007 J Award for Australian album of the year on Australian youth independent radio station Triple J. A second album, Lucille was released in early 2010. A self-titled third album was released on 14 October 2011.

Discography

Albums

Live albums

Extended plays

Awards and nominations

J Award
The J Awards are an annual series of Australian music awards that were established by the Australian Broadcasting Corporation's youth-focused radio station Triple J. They commenced in 2005.

|-
| J Awards of 2007
|Oh We Do Like to Be Beside the Seaside
| Australian Album of the Year
|

References

External links
 The Vasco Era Official Homepage
 Triple J Next Crop Artist review - The Vasco Era

Victoria (Australia) musical groups